Athletics competitions at the 1994 Micronesian Games were held in Mangilao, Guam, between March 27 - April 2, 1994.

A total of 32 events were contested, 16 by men and 16 by women.

Medal summary
Medal winners and their results were published on the Athletics Weekly webpage
courtesy of Tony Isaacs.  Complete results can be found at the Pacific Islands Athletics Statistics.

Men

Women

Medal table (unofficial)

References

Athletics at the Micronesian Games
Athletics in Guam
Micronesian Games
1994 in Guamanian sports